Tournefortia pubescens is a species of plant in the family Boraginaceae. It is endemic to the Galápagos Islands.

References

pubescens
Flora of the Galápagos Islands
Endemic flora of Ecuador
Least concern plants
Least concern biota of South America
Taxonomy articles created by Polbot